Contrasts is a 1955 studio album by Erroll Garner. Giving it a four-star rating, Scott Yanow of AllMusic wrote: "Erroll Garner never recorded an uninspired solo, and this CD is as good a place as any to explore his joyful music.". The album was issued on compact disc in 1988 under the title The Original Misty with a different track ordering.

Track listing 
Original LP
 "You Are My Sunshine" (Jimmie Davis, Charles Mitchell) – 3:26
 "I've Got the World on a String" (Harold Arlen, Ted Koehler) – 3:58
 "7-11 Jump" (Erroll Garner) – 7:16
 "Part Time Blues" (Garner) – 4:31
 "Rosalie" (Cole Porter) – 2:35
 "In a Mellow Tone" (Duke Ellington, Milt Gabler) – 4:17
 "Don't Worry 'Bout Me" (Rube Bloom, Koehler) – 5:01
 "(All of a Sudden) My Heart Sings" (Jean Marie Blanvillain, Henri Herpin, Harold Rome) – 3:19
 "There's a Small Hotel" (Lorenz Hart, Richard Rodgers) – 3:08
 "Misty" (Garner) – 2:45
 "I've Got to Be a Rug Cutter" (Duke Ellington) – 2:19
Bonus tracks (CD reissue)
 "Sweet and Lovely" (Gus Arnheim, Jules LeMare, Harry Tobias) – 3:53
 "Exactly Like You" (Dorothy Fields, Jimmy McHugh) – 3:10

Personnel 
 Erroll Garner - piano
 Wyatt Ruther - double bass
 Fats Heard - drums
 Candido Camero - percussion/congas on track 12

References 

Erroll Garner albums
1955 albums
EmArcy Records albums